The 1902 North Kilkenny by-election was held on 26 February 1902 after resignation of the incumbent MP Patrick McDermott of the Irish Parliamentary Party.  The IPP's candidate Joseph Devlin was unopposed and so was returned as the MP.

References

Unopposed by-elections to the Parliament of the United Kingdom in Irish constituencies
1902 elections in the United Kingdom
February 1902 events
By-elections to the Parliament of the United Kingdom in County Kilkenny constituencies
1902 elections in Ireland